Goldrush is a song by Swiss electronic band Yello, released in 1986 from the album One Second.

Track listing 
7" single

12" single

Charts

References 

Yello songs
1986 songs
1986 singles
Songs written by Boris Blank (musician)
Songs written by Dieter Meier
Fontana Records singles
Vertigo Records singles
Mercury Records singles